Henry Frank Schroeder (December 7, 1874–January 26, 1959) was a soldier in the United States Army who received the Medal of Honor during the Philippine–American War at Carig in the Philippines.

Schroeder joined the Army from Chicago in July 1896, and permanently retired with the rank of Major in August 1930.

Medal of Honor citation
Rank and organization: Sergeant, Company L, 16th U.S. Infantry. Place and date: At Carig, Philippine Islands, September 14, 1900. Entered service at: Chicago, Ill. Birth: Chicago, Ill. Date of issue: March 10, 1902.

Citation:

With 22 men defeated 400 insurgents, killing 36 and wounding 90.

After the war
Schroeder died in 1959 and is buried at the Fort Rosecrans National Cemetery in Point Loma, California.

See also

List of Medal of Honor recipients

References

1874 births
1959 deaths
United States Army Medal of Honor recipients
Military personnel from Chicago
United States Army officers
Burials at Fort Rosecrans National Cemetery
American military personnel of the Philippine–American War
Philippine–American War recipients of the Medal of Honor